Japanese Best Dirt Horse is a title awarded annually by the Japan Racing Association (JRA).
Since 1987 the honor has been part of the JRA Awards.

Records
Most successful horse (2 wins):
 Wing Arrow – 1998, 2000
 Admire Don – 2003, 2004
 Kane Hekili – 2005, 2008
 Espoir City – 2009, 2010

Leading trainer (2 wins):
 Katsumi Minai – Wing Arrow (1998, 2000)
 Hiroyoshi Matsuda – Admire Don (2003, 2004)
 Sei Ishizaka – Alondite (2006), Vermilion (2007)
Katsuhiko Sumii - Kane Hekili (2005, 2008)
 Akio Adachi – Espoir City (2009, 2010)
 Kunihide Matsuda – Kurofune (2001), Belshazzar (2013)

Leading owner (4 wins):
 Makoto Kaneko – Wing Arrow (2000), Kurofune (2001), Kane Hekili (2005, 2008)

Winners

References

Horse racing in Japan: JRA Awards

Horse racing awards
Horse racing in Japan